Umala Municipality is the second municipal section of the Aroma Province in the  La Paz Department, Bolivia. Its seat is Umala.

See also 
 Cañaviri
 Kuntur Amaya

References 

  Instituto Nacional de Estadística de Bolivia  (INE)

Municipalities of La Paz Department (Bolivia)